The Chicago Grand Prix is a defunct professional tennis tournament played on indoor carpet courts. It was part of the Grand Prix circuit. It was held annually at the UIC Pavilion in Chicago, Illinois, USA from 1985 to 1987. It is unrelated to a World Championship Tennis event held in Chicago for one year in 1982.

The singles tournament saw four American players reach the final in the three years of the tournament: Tim Mayotte won the title in 1987 against countryman David Pate, John McEnroe beat compatriot Jimmy Connors in 1985. Boris Becker defeated Ivan Lendl in 1986. In doubles, American duo Ken Flach and Robert Seguso reached the final on two occasions, winning in 1986 and losing in 1985.

Past finals

Singles

Doubles

See also
List of tennis tournaments

External links
 ATP tournament profile

Defunct tennis tournaments in the United States
Tennis in Chicago
Grand Prix tennis circuit